The  is a kei car/city car with distinctive retro styling made by the Japanese automaker Daihatsu from 1999 to 2009. It is based on the more mainstream Mira and was first introduced to the Japanese market in 1999, with the second generation model following in 2004. The Mira Gino replaced the Mira Classic which is a subvariant of the L500 series Mira. The second generation model was also exported as the Daihatsu Trevis to some markets in Europe such as Germany, the Netherlands, Italy, Gibraltar and France.



First generation (L700; 1999) 

The first generation Mira Gino was introduced in 1999 and was available in either three or five-door versions. The car is based on the L700 series Mira, which was produced between 1998 and 2002. The car was originally only available with the 658 cc EF series inline-three petrol engine, in naturally aspirated or turbocharged. Either front- or four-wheel drive is available. It features a retro styling, which evokes the design of the Compagno and the classic Mini.

An unusual development was the installation of the European market 989 cc EJ-VE inline-three petrol engine in the Mira Gino 1000, presented in August 2002. This version no longer fit into the "kei" class because of its larger engine and was also marginally longer and wider due to the installation of bumper overriders and fender trim. The bigger engine produced , the same as the turbocharged 658 cc engine, but offered considerably more power at lower engine speeds. 1,290 units of the Gino 1000 had been built when production of the first generation came to an end in June 2004. The Gino 1000 was effectively replaced by the 1.0 L variant of the Boon.

Second generation (L650; 2004) 

For the second generation model, the three-door version was dropped and it was only available as a five-door hatchback. The Mira Gino was discontinued in March 2009 and replaced by the Mira Cocoa, also with retro styling albeit more original.

The styling was again inspired by the Mini, although this time the newer BMW-built Mini set the example.

Mira Gino
Cars introduced in 1999
2000s cars
Kei cars
City cars
Hatchbacks
Front-wheel-drive vehicles
All-wheel-drive vehicles
Vehicles with CVT transmission
Retro-style automobiles